MMSAT-1 (also known as Lawkanat-1) is a Burmese microsatellite launched to the International Space Station (ISS) on 20 February 2021 and was deployed into orbit from the ISS on 22 March 2021. It is Myanmar's first microsatellite and jointly built by Japan's Hokkaido University and Myanmar Aerospace Engineering University. It was delivered to the ISS by the American cargo spacecraft Cygnus NG-15. MMSAT-1 was temporarily held on ISS and its deployment was delayed due to the 2021 Myanmar coup d'état. It was deployed into orbit on 22 March 2021.

The satellite is intended to be used not only for environmental observation and mineral exploration, but also for natural disaster control, but human rights activists worried that the satellite could be used for military purposes. According to Hokkaido University, as Myanmar does not yet have the necessary equipment, it will initially be operated from Japan.

References 

Earth observation satellites
Satellites of Myanmar
2021 in Myanmar
Spacecraft launched in 2021
Satellites deployed from the International Space Station